Watton's Green or Wattons Green is a hamlet near the M25 motorway, in the Brentwood, in the county of Essex, England. It is located about 4 miles away from the town of Brentwood.

References
Essex A-Z 2010 (page 94)

Hamlets in Essex
Borough of Brentwood